Hank Chien is a former world record holder and two-time "Kong-Off" Champion of the video game Donkey Kong.
As of January 2016, his personal best sits at 1,138,600. Chien won the first Kong Off, a Donkey Kong competition which occurred on March 19–20, 2011. The competition featured Steve Wiebe, Billy Mitchell and eight other competitors. Chien won with a score of 994,400.

Hank Chien was born in Taiwan and moved to the U.S. with his family at the age of two. He works as a plastic surgeon in Queens.

The documentary Doctor Kong: Cutting Up the Competition, follows his first attempt to break the world record.

References

1974 births
Living people
American people of Chinese descent
American people of Taiwanese descent
Taiwanese esports players
American esports players
American plastic surgeons
Donkey Kong players
Physicians from New York City
Harvard University alumni
Icahn School of Medicine at Mount Sinai alumni
People from Queens, New York